Sultan Khlaifa al-Khulaifi is a Qatari blogger, human rights activist, and the former Secretary-General of the Swiss-based Alkarama Foundation.

Al-Khulaifi was arrested in Qatar in March 2011 and held for a month without charge. Both before and after his arrest, al-Khulaifi advocated for individuals with close connections to freedom organizations.

Views
Between early 2009 and 2010, Al-Khulaifi wrote a blog which recorded his personal and political views. In April 2009, al-Khulaifi published a post addressed to the Emir and people of Qatar. In the post, al-Khulaifi criticised the Qatari government for holding secular and what he called “blasphemous” laws about alcohol consumption, bars, and discos. He held the government responsible for the spread of prostitution. Al-Khulaifi called the government "un-Islamismic" because it did not follow the selected Qur'anic texts he provided in his post.

Al-Khulaifi also criticised the policies of the Qatar government concerning Israel. Al-Khulaifi objected to the visit of the Israeli politician, Shimon Peres to Doha. He suggested the Qatar government should sever diplomatic communications with Israel. Al-Khulaifi objected to United States military forces having a presence in Qatar from which to operate in Iraq and Afghanistan.

Al-Khulaifi names Sayyid Qutb’s Milestones as his favorite book. Milestones is based on the Qutbic Islamist ideology.

Human rights activism
Until 2010, Al-Khulaifi served as Secretary-General of the Alkarama Foundation, a Swiss based human rights non-governmental organisation. The Alkarama Foundation stated that al-Khulaifi had left the organization in 2010 "to found a new organization for the defense of human rights".

In early 2013, Doha News reported that al-Khulaifi was working with the Geneva-registered Adel Group for Human Rights. The Adel Group for Human Rights primarily examines cases of detention in Qatar. Al-Khulaifi wrote on his blog about such cases.

Arrest and detention
On March 2, 2011, al-Khulaifi was arrested at approximately 9 p.m. at his Doha residence by state security agents. The agents searched his house and car for two hours. Alkarama reported that an officer informed al-Khulaifi's wife that the agents had been sent by the Attorney General but that they were unable to produce a judicial warrant. Alkarama was concerned the arrest related to al-Khulaifi's work in the field of human rights. Al-Khulaifi was detained for a month. Following al-Khulaifi's arrest, Amnesty International released a statement of concern which said al-Khulaifi was at risk of torture or other ill-treatment.

Al Jazeera noted that Al-Khalaifi's last blog post prior to his arrest had criticized censorship in Qatar. His lawyer stated that he was detained "just for expressing his own opinion, it must be, because [he] was detained three, four, or ten times already by special security and he's still insisting in his own opinion". The Qatari government declined to comment. Al-Khalaifi was released with charge in April.

Reactions 
Amnesty International criticized the arrest, calling for al-Khalaifi to have access to his lawyer and family and be guaranteed a fair trial and protection against torture. Front Line described his arrest as "directly related to his legitimate and peaceful work in defence of human rights" and called for his release; Index on Censorship also described him as an imprisoned "human rights activist". Freedom House discussed the incident in its 2012 Freedom in the World report alleging state censorship in Qatar, and Reporters Without Borders included al-Khalaifi on its list of imprisoned netizens.

US conservative watchdog Accuracy in Media later criticized the reporting of the Qatar-owned network Al Jazeera on the al-Khalaifi case, for an article which concluded "The Qatari government could not be contacted for comment". A spokesman asked, "How could they not get comment from the very regime that owns them? That just doesn't make any sense."

References

Living people
Qatari bloggers
Qatari human rights activists
Qatari Islamists
Qatari prisoners and detainees
Year of birth missing (living people)
Qatari activists